Overture Center for the Arts is a performing arts center and art gallery in Madison, Wisconsin, United States. The center opened on September 19, 2004, replacing the former Civic Center. In addition to several theaters, the center also houses the Madison Museum of Contemporary Art.

History 
The center was commissioned by Jerome "Jerry" Frautschi and Pleasant Rowland (founder of American Girl) and designed by César Pelli. Pelli's most famous work is likely the Petronas Twin Towers in Kuala Lumpur, the world's tallest twin skyscrapers. Pelli also designed the Brookfield Place, formerly named the World Financial Center complex, in downtown Manhattan.

The entire building costs were covered by multiple gifts totaling $205 million from Fraustchi and Rowland. The Overture Center for the Arts building replaced the Madison Civic Center, which was located on the same block on State Street.

Since opening in 2004, the Overture Center has had five Presidents and CEOs. Bob D'Angelo, the first President and CEO, resigned in 2005 following an Overture Center employee's allegations of sexual harassment. Following his resignation, D'Angelo served 10 months of a one-year prison term for tax evasion and misusing his city office. More recent Presidents and CEOs of the Overture Center include Michael Goldberg, Tom Carto, Ted DeDee and Sandra Gajic.

Venues

Overture Hall 
The 2,251-seat Overture Hall is the cultural center's largest theater. Consisting of four levels of seats, it has a striking architectural style and was designed for acoustics (no center aisle). The balconies have "continental-style" seating arrangements, where aisles other than those on the sides of seat rows are omitted in order to provide greater seat size and acoustics. It houses the Pleasant Rowland Concert Organ, a large, custom-built organ, by the German organ builder Orgelbau Klais. This theater hosts the Madison Symphony Orchestra, Madison Opera, and Madison Ballet.

Capitol Theater 
During Overture construction, the Oscar Mayer Theater (originally the 1928 Capitol Theater and movie palace) was restored, downsized, and re-christened the Capitol Theater. The theater's inaugural performance, Wisconsin Chamber Orchestra, upon reopening took place in November 2005. The theater seats up to 1098 people on the main floor and balcony. The theater features an organ built by Oshkosh's Barton Organ Company. Resident companies include the Wisconsin Chamber Orchestra and CTM Madison Family Theatre, including regular performances from traveling shows and concerts.

Playhouse 
This smaller, intimate performance space replaced the former Isthmus Playhouse. It was renovated with the Madison Repertory Theatre in mind as its resident company and was occupied by Madison Rep until its closure in March 2009.

Promenade Hall 
The Promenade Hall is a smaller room, featuring bleachers in the walls which can convert it into a performance space seating up to 300. Kanopy Dance is its resident company.

Rotunda Stage 
This room, located on the lower level, is used primarily for the center's Kids in the Rotunda performances. The only venue accessible to the public during regular hours, it features a color scheme of fuchsia walls and floors, as well as permanent audience riser seats. It is also a venue for banquets, meetings, and other performances.

Wisconsin Studio and Rotunda Studio 
These two venues are used mainly for rehearsals and meetings. They are also fully equipped black box theater spaces seating up to 200 guests, depending on their configuration.

Visual art galleries 
The center contains four visual art galleries. The Overture Galleries present exhibits by local and state artists and organizations. The center houses the James Watrous Gallery, which is operated by the Wisconsin Academy of Sciences, Arts, and Letters. The Watrous Gallery displays larger exhibits and installations from regional artists. Both galleries are free and open to the public.

Controversies

Financial controversies
After Frautschi and Rowland's initial gift of $100 million, the philanthropists donated another $100 million to ensure it would be a "state-of-the-art" venue. Some citizens complained that the City of Madison's priorities were skewed. Some critics argued the project would hurt the image of nearby State Street. Still, others believed that the cultural center would only be accessible for the wealthy while limiting access to local and smaller acts and artists.

After the initial construction of the center, concerns were raised over additional funding. Citizens became concerned that Overture's reserve funds would decrease as the economy slowed. During the Great Recession, the potential was raised for the City of Madison to step in to maintain funding levels. Some citizens worried that a private project would grow to become an unnecessary burden to taxpayers.

These fears were exacerbated by the liquidation of the trust fund that was set up to pay the construction debt for the building as well as provide some operating income. The liquidation left some construction debt that was paid for by Jerry Frautschi, Pleasant Rowland, and a number of their friends and associates. The endowment liquidations forced the center to cut staff because of the loss of operating income. The Overture Center continues to be a privately owned facility and is now run by a non-profit; it is no longer a City of Madison agency. The Center receives an annual subsidy from the city approximately equal to the amount subsidized to the Madison Civic Center, a facility owned by the city.

With an estimated operating budget of $18.4 million, the Overture Center seemed to have emerged from its financial difficulty in fiscal year July to June 2012–13. Staffing levels now exceed the level before the forced endowment liquidation.

2019 Miss Saigon controversy

Background on Overture's Racial Equity Initiative 
After a presentation of the Race to Equity Report, published by the Wisconsin Council on Children and Families, the Overture Center started the Racial Equity Initiative in 2014. The Race to Equity Report indicated significant racial disparities in Dane County. To help fulfill the "Race to Equity" initiatives, the Overture Center hired Ed Holmes as the center’s first director of diversity and inclusion in August 2016.

Public objections, panel discussion and teach-in 
When the Overture Center scheduled a touring production of Miss Saigon in April 2019, local scholars and members of the Asian American community voiced their concerns about the controversial show.

In his 2019 essay on the Overture Center's production of Miss Saigon, Dr. Timothy Yu wrote, "It continues a tradition that views the Asian woman as a sexual object to be conquered by the white hero–a stereotype highlighted by the fact that the Vietnamese women in Miss Saigon are all prostitutes. They are, as scholar Karen Shimakawa puts it, “either hypersexualized Dragon Ladies in string bikinis or Kim, the single Lotus Blossom—shy, passive, virginal in an ersatz Vietnamese wedding gown.”

Following public objections, the Overture Center staff worked with a group of scholars and members of the Asian American community to organize a free, publicly accessible panel discussion called "Asian American Perspectives on Miss Saigon: Stereotypes, History and Community." This panel was intended to center Asian American perspectives on Asian American portrayals in media and entertainment.

The days leading up to the event were marked by disagreements and repeated restructuring. The Overture Center replaced one of the panelists with a local theater producer, whose company staged a concert version of Miss Saigon in 2007. This new panelist replaced scholar Lori Kido-Lopez, who had contributed significantly to the panel's development. The event was then re-titled, "Perspectives on Miss Saigon: History and Community". In addition, a critical essay written by Dr. Timothy Yu — composed at the Overture Center's request — would no longer be included as a program insert.

Shortly after, the Overture Center informed the panelists that the questions prepared by scholar and moderator Leslie Bow would no longer be included. Instead, the Overture Center would "ask their own questions." Bow's original set of questions included: "How do plays like this impact American impressions about Vietnamese people?"; "Do you think that the southeast Asian community will find this show appealing?"; "Who is responsible for bringing diverse stories and productions to the stage?"; and "How might theatre contribute to racial awareness?" President and CEO Sandra Gajic described these questions as "inflammatory." Gajic argued that the tone was “adversarial... blaming Overture and me personally for having Miss Saigon in our season put us in an unfair position.” She continued: “Vietnamese, Asians — many of them love the show.”

On the morning of the planned event, the panel was delayed indefinitely by the Overture Center. Holmes explained in a press release that "the center canceled the panel out of concern that it was 'becoming more of a lecture than a dialogue.'" In response to the sudden cancellation, the Asian American panelists held a "teach-in" protest outside of the Overture Center. Several weeks after the production closed, the Overture attempted to reschedule the panel; the original panelists declined to participate.

Public apologies & outcomes 
Following the controversial cancellation, President and CEO Sandra Gajic published a public apology on social media. She wrote, "We apologize for postponing last night’s event. That was a mistake and sent the wrong message. It was never our intent to shut down dialogue but rather ensure that the environment we were creating actually fostered a productive discussion."

Regarding the removal of Yu's essay, Gajic told the press that a program insert was never an option.  “We can’t put anything in our program books," Gajic explained. This claim was disputed by Yu, who publicly shared an email establishing that Overture had offered to include a two-page insert in the Miss Saigon program to provide further context. Overture's vice president of sales, Lex Poppens, confirmed that the Overture Center had offered Yu "the opportunity to write two pages in the program book … and he did submit the pages." Poppens clarified that the production company, Broadway Across America, did not approve of the program insert.

In response, Gajic published a second apology in The Cap Times newspaper on April 1, 2019. She wrote, "Moving forward, I am focusing on what we can do differently and better, and how we can look more critically at our programming and the criteria we use to select it. This includes how we can better foster discussion with diverse voices in our community and incorporate feedback."

Later that day, Edgewood College canceled a planned trip to the production due to increased awareness of the show's content. In a statement, they wrote: "This cancellation is due to the ongoing protests taking place throughout the Madison Community. The play romanticizes the Vietnam War and perpetuates common stereotypes about Asian women. We in OSII will not support anything that shows any person of gender, color, nationality, creed, sexual orientation, in a negative portrayal." Edgewood College's cancellation notice also directed to the commissioned essay written by Dr. Yu.

Notable performers

Following is a partial list of notable performers that have staged concerts at the Capitol Theater and Overture Center:

See also
 List of concert halls

References

External links
 Official Overture Center site
 Madison Museum of Contemporary Art

César Pelli buildings
Performing arts centers in Wisconsin
Culture of Madison, Wisconsin
Art museums and galleries in Wisconsin
Theatres in Wisconsin
Tourist attractions in Madison, Wisconsin
Buildings and structures in Madison, Wisconsin
Public venues with a theatre organ
Orientalism